Demona, voiced by Marina Sirtis, is a fictional character and one of the primary antagonists of the Disney animated television series Gargoyles. Demona was once Goliath's mate and was part of their 10th century AD castle's Wyvern Clan. She is consumed by a hatred of humanity and has attempted several times to destroy it.

Character design

In the original pitch for the series, the initial leader of the gargoyle clan was Dakota, but it was later decided she would work best as a villain, and thus her name was changed to Demona.

Character biography

Demona was a member of the Gargoyle clan at the medieval Scottish Castle Wyvern, Goliath's mate and second-in-command. Like the rest of the clan, Demona originally had no formal name, though Goliath frequently referred to her as his "Angel of the Night". The two mated and eventually had a daughter, Angela, who would join the Manhattan Clan 1000 years into the future. Resentful of human prejudice toward her clan, Demona conspired with the Captain of the Guard to betray the humans inhabiting Castle Wyvern to the Viking raiders. However, Demona failed to convince Goliath to get the gargoyles away from the castle - her end of the bargain - and the clan was slaughtered during daylight. When Goliath returned with Hudson, he was devastated to see the murder of his clan, which he believed included his mate. Demona abandoned the castle with the intent of coming back once he had calmed down, returning only to find the six survivors, including Goliath, under the Magus' stone sleep curse. This broke her heart, beginning the downward spiral in Demona's life of loneliness and pain.

Alone for several years, Demona had an encounter with a child named Gillecomgain (based loosely on Gille Coemgáin of Moray), scarring his face when he catches her stealing food. Gillecomgain becomes the original Hunter, the progenitor of a millennial-long line of mercenary and assassin descendants seeking revenge against her. She is later joined by surviving Gargoyles from other clans in 997. During the year, she encounters a time lost Brooklyn, who convinces her and the clan to help Kenneth III fight against Constantine. Though she agrees, she plans to retrieve the Grimorum Arcanorum after it is taken by Constantine's sorcerer Brother Valmont. After Kenneth's side has won the battle, the freed Phoenix (the former prisoner of the Phoenix Gate) is about to take the "timedancing" Brooklyn to another time period. Since Brooklyn suspects that Demona wants the Grimorum to use in taking over Scotland, Brooklyn offers to hold it while she takes out her half of The Phoenix Gate and while Brooklyn is whisked away. By 1020 A.D., Demona allies herself with a young Macbeth to kill their common enemy of Gillecomgain. In 1032 A.D, an elderly Demona enters into a bargain with Macbeth; Macbeth entered it to protect his kingdom from his cousin Duncan I of Scotland, while Demona wanted her youth back so she could lead the last of her kind. The pact is facilitated by the Weird Sisters, rendering both of them immortal, except if one kills the other, in which case both would perish. Neither of them realized that the Weird Sisters and the evil Archmage from Castle Wyvern planned to take over the mystical island of Avalon in the 20th century, with their help. Macbeth himself soon comes to admire Demona's combat prowess, and eventually becomes heavily dependent on Demona's clan for support in the war with Duncan's forces. In the final battle with Duncan in August 1040, Demona's devastating attacks so impress Macbeth, he exclaimed, "You fight like a demon!" — directly inspiring him to name her "Demona" (lit. "She-Demon"), for the first time, a name she finds very pleasing, and simultaneously declares her as his primary adviser. The two become fast friends, and it appears that Demona's life may turn around for the better. Eventually, Demona's trust in Macbeth evaporates after overhearing Macbeth's courtier advising him on severing their ties with the Gargoyles in order to win the support of the English. Fearing that this would come to pass (though Macbeth strongly denies it), she abandons his forces to Duncan's son Canmore and the English armies. Canmore, in turn, betrays her, killing the last of her clan. Demona would not enter into another alliance with a human for almost a thousand years. During the intervening time, she amasses a substantial fortune, while plotting her revenge on humanity; all the while being hunted by Canmore's descendants, who take up the mask of the Hunter. One hunter attacked her in Florence in 1495. According to Greg Weisman: "In 1920, Demona would encounter a hunter, Fiona Canmore in Paris, France. This event would have been seen in the unfinished Team Atlantis series."  She encounters and kills another hunter named Charles Canmore in Paris in 1980.

Some time before 1994, Demona allied herself with David Xanatos, gets him the Grimorum Arcanorum, and tells him about the spell put upon the Gargoyles at Castle Wyvern. This leads Xanatos to bringing the castle to Manhattan and waking up Goliath and the rest of the clan. Despite her and Xanatos's efforts to manipulate them, the clan refused to join her vendetta and actively opposes her. She later assisted Xanatos in resurrecting one of the dead Gargoyles from Wyvern, Coldstone, attempted to murder Elisa Maza, and also tried to exterminate humanity on numerous occasions; first by having Puck destroy them (which failed: he impishly "destroyed" the humans by turning them into gargoyles), and then used magic to turn them into stone during the night, allowing her to go on a vicious murder spree. When magic and sorcery failed, she turned to science by hiring geneticist and villain Anton Sevarius, to help create a virus that would destroy all human life on Earth. When she was invited to Xanatos and Fox's wedding as the bridesmaid, with Goliath as the best man, she attended, claiming that she needed to keep Xanatos as an ally for the time being. However, it was a plot to restore the Phoenix Gate. The four traveled back to 975 AD, where Xanatos would fulfill his own destiny, while Demona showed her past self her clan frozen during the night. These events lead up to her hatred of humanity.

Demona is also granted a "gift" by the magical being Puck: after she requests that he make her able to walk in daylight without turning to stone, he devises and casts a spell that transforms Demona into a human at sunrise, and remains so during the day until sunset, when she transforms back into her "gargate" form. The transformation is incredibly painful, and it hurts Macbeth when he is in proximity as part of their binding spell. Though initially furious at Puck's trick, she realized the positive uses of her human form as she later took up the alias of Dominique Destine. Using the immense fortune and resources that she acquired over the years, she formed a company called Nightstone Unlimited and became its CEO. She uses the company to further her goals when she cannot do as a Gargoyle. She allied herself with Goliath's evil clone Thailog to first, steal Macbeth's fortune, and when failing that, creating their own version of the Manhattan Clan through cloning. Though, the ever treacherous Thailog had other plans and betrayed her, leaving her for dead after a fight with the Manhattan Clan. She was later revealed to be alive. At the end of the show's run, she was still trying to successfully execute her ultimate plan of the destruction of the human race while trying to reach out to her daughter Angela, and win her over to her cause. She is incredibly overprotective of Angela and will step in and defend her if she is attacked.  Demona was last seen on Halloween in Saint Damien's Cathedral recovering the crystal ruins of the Praying Gargoyle.

Powers and abilities

Demona possesses most of the standard superhuman attributes common to all members of her species. Demona is superhumanly strong, sufficiently so to easily crush or shatter guns in her grasp. Demona's agility, reflexes, and stamina are also much greater than those of a human. Her body is somewhat tougher and more resistant to certain kinds of injury than those of humans. She can withstand great impact forces, such as being struck with a blunt object or falling from several stories, or being struck by a superhumanly strong being, that would severely injure or kill a human being. However, Demona can be injured by conventional bullets, bladed weapons, or more advanced weaponry, such as lasers, just as easily as a human can. Also, Demona's eyes glow a deep red when she is angry, unlike male gargoyles, whose eyes glow white.

Demona, like all gargoyles, has physiology distinctly different from the human species. While she is vaguely humanoid in shape, but with wings and a tail, many gargoyle bodily functions are distinctly non-human. For example, all gargoyle females lay eggs just as monotremes do. Demona possesses large, bat-like wings that she is able to use to glide on currents of air. Combined with her great strength, her claws are capable of rending most materials, including stone and most types of metals. Demona also has a long, prehensile tail that she uses to help keep herself balanced while gliding or while running at high speeds. She can also use this tail as a weapon and even to wrap around objects and grip them if she chooses to. As seen in a number of episodes, items held by a gargoyle often will turn to stone as well, a magical effect which also affects their clothes.

Due to the spell simultaneously cast upon her and Macbeth by the Weird Sisters, Demona is functionally immortal in the sense that she no longer ages and cannot die through conventional means. Their shared spell of immortality also only allows them to be killed for good if one of them kills the other, which will result in the deaths of both of them simultaneously, as they will otherwise eventually recover. Also, they can experience one another's pain (ala Corsican Brothers) if they are physically close to each other. At a later time, thanks to a spell cast by Puck, she now transforms into a human at sunrise instead of entering a normal gargoyle's period of "stone slumber", and resumes her gargoyle form at sunset, with both transformations generating a great deal of pain when they occur. Demona begins to use her daytime human guise for her own nefarious plots, now using the alias of "Dominique Destine".

Demona had secretly studied with the Archmage as his apprentice and had developed an aptitude in sorcery, and due to her aforementioned  immortality, she has also become quite adept at understanding and using advanced technology. Demona is also a highly formidable combatant, both armed and unarmed, with skills concerning a broad variety of weaponry ranging from swords to the most advanced firearms. She also has a general understanding of chemistry, although nowhere close to the expertise of "freelance geneticist" Anton Sevarius. From her acquired daytime existence as the human female "Dominique Destine", Demona is quite adept at manipulating the systems of modern society. Specifically, Demona's daytime human identity allows her to utilize her vast fortune without suspicion, partly helping her to acquire a lavishly appointed home with many modern comforts, made much easier with her daytime identity. Her functional immortality has helped her to gain a substantial degree of knowledge about, and experience with how modern society operates. Demona does function well enough in the modern world up to a point — for example, she knew how to hail a cab while in human form and used slang terms on a few occasions.

Demona at one point possessed a number of pages torn from the Grimorum Arcanorum, the central and ancient spell book of magic in the Gargoyles series, of which the majority are presumably still in her possession. These removed pages contain spells that can be used as formidable magical weapons that Demona can  bring to bear against the Manhattan Clan and humanity in general. She has thus far invoked three different spells from the Grimorum, two of which were ripped out of the book after the failure of the first. The first such spell was an attempt to turn Goliath into a slave of whoever held the spell which ensnared his mind. Originally this spell was contained within the book itself, but Brooklyn tore it from its pages in order to keep her from using Goliath any further. Elisa later using the spell to order Goliath to act for the rest of his life as though he wasn't under its influence when they couldn't find a means to break the original spell. The second spell she used was taken from the torn pages of the Grimorum, and was used during the four part "City of Stone" story arc to turn Manhattan's human population to stone during the night, although it was eventually negated when the clause was triggered and the night sky blazed bright thanks to Xanatos and the Manhattan Clan working together to disperse a combustible chemical through the air. The last spell was used in the Hunter's Moon episodes in which she intended to use a mix of sorcery and science to destroy all other intelligent life on Earth except for the Gargoyle species, by dispersing a lethal virus while using an enchanted statue to protect Gargoyles, but this plan was averted when the statue was destroyed, thus creating the possibility that gargoyles would succumb to the infection as well. Although each attempt at the use of magic to achieve her goals has been thwarted, the remaining pages she possesses, if any, means she has many other methods by which she might yet achieve her desire for the elimination of mankind. Whether or not she ever used them is unknown, as the series came to an end after the events of the third-season spin-off The Goliath Chronicles. In one of the spin-offs originally pitched by series co-creator Weisman, Demona would have eventually reformed during one of the Gargoyles spin-off ideas set in the far future. This would indicate that whatever weapons or plots she had at her disposal, they either failed, or she simply did not use them.

In other media and merchandise
 

Demona is the end boss in the video game Gargoyles.

Reception

In 2011, UGO.com included the Weird Sisters' spell bonding Demona with Macbeth on their list of the TV's most horrible curses.  In 2016, Demona was #3 on MsMojo's Top 10 TV Cartoon Villainesses.  As of 2021, nearly 25 years after the show’s conclusion, Demona remained popular in the midst of Gargoyles’ success on Disney+, and several new lines of toys and action figures were announced for her.

See also
List of female supervillains

References

External links
 
 Demona - Gargwiki

Further reading

Female characters in animated series
Fictional female businesspeople
Television characters introduced in 1994
Fictional characters with superhuman strength
Fictional characters who use magic
Fictional mass murderers
Fictional characters from New York City
Fictional shapeshifters
Fictional Scottish people
Fictional women soldiers and warriors
Gargoyles (TV series) characters
Video game bosses
Villains in animated television series
Fictional characters with immortality
Disney animated villains
Female villains
Animated characters introduced in 1994